The 2018–19 UC Riverside Highlanders men's basketball team represented the University of California, Riverside in the 2018–19 NCAA Division I men's basketball season. The Highlanders, led by first-year head coach David Patrick, competed at the SRC Arena. UC Riverside was a member of the Big West Conference, and participated in their 18th consecutive season in that league.

Before the season

The Highlanders finished 9–22 overall, and 4–12 in the conference. In the postseason, UC Riverside lost to UC Davis in the quarterfinals of 2018 Big West Conference men's basketball tournament in Anaheim, California.

Roster

Schedule

|-
!colspan=12 style=""| Non–conference regular season

|-
!colspan=12 style=""| Big West regular season

|-
!colspan=12 style=""| Big West tournament

Source:

References

UC Riverside
UC Riverside Highlanders men's basketball seasons
UC Riverside
UC Riverside